Christian Letard (born 23 November 1947) is a French retired football manager who most recently managed Congo. Besides France, he has managed in Congo and Vietnam.

Career
In 1981, Letard was appointed manager of French third division side Roche-sur-Yon, helping them earn promotion to the French second division. In 1989, he was appointed manager of Le Mans in the French second division, where he suffered relegation to the French third division. In 1994, Letard was appointed manager of French fourth division club Grenoble.

In 2002, he was appointed manager of Vietnam U23, where he successfully sued the Vietnam Football Federation for unfair dismissal. In 2004, Letard was appointed manager of Congo, where he said, "I am not Zorro. Nor those marabouts of illusions who manage, alas, to convince their credulous employers in Africa that four months of intensive preparation is enough to compete with the best teams on the continent".

References

1947 births
Living people
Sportspeople from Vendée
French footballers
Association football midfielders
French football managers
Le Mans FC managers
Grenoble Foot 38 managers
Tours FC managers
Angoulême Charente FC managers
Congo national football team managers
Ligue 2 managers
French expatriate football managers
Expatriate football managers in Vietnam
Footballers from Pays de la Loire